Bake Squad is an American Netflix Original series which premiered on August 11, 2021, for a first season of eight episodes and a second season published on January 20, 2023 with eight episodes. It is presented by Christina Tosi, and features a returning group of four bakers who compete to make desserts for a different client each episode.

Format 

The series is only lightly competitive, with no prizes or elimination-style elements. Instead, the focus is on creating elaborate desserts for a per-episode client—usually for a celebration, wedding, or birthday. The bakers typically have seven hours to produce their desserts before presenting them.

Bakers periodically request help from Tosi for equipment or decorative pieces, such as chocolate molds or a claw machine, to showcase enhance their creation. After the client chooses a dessert, Tosi takes a picture of the client(s) and the winning baker with an instant camera, which is placed on a bulletin board signifying the win. The episode finishes with scenes from the client's celebration.

The recurring competing bakers are:

 Ashley Holt – Cake Decorator
 Christophe Rull – Pastry Chef
 Maya-Camille Broussard – Pastry Chef
 Gonzo Jimenez – Chocolatier

Episodes 

Bold indicates the baker(s) who produced the winning creation per-episode.

Season 1:

Season 2:

References

2020s American reality television series
Food reality television series
English-language Netflix original programming
2021 American television series debuts
Cooking competitions in the United States